Edwyn Charles Huang (born March 1, 1982) is an American author, chef, restaurateur, food personality, producer, and former attorney. He was a co-owner of  BaoHaus, a gua bao restaurant in the East Village of Lower Manhattan. Huang previously hosted Huang's World for Viceland. His autobiography, Fresh Off the Boat: A Memoir, was adapted into the ABC sitcom Fresh Off the Boat, of which he narrated the first season.

Early life and education
Huang was born in Washington, D.C., to Jessica and Louis Huang, who were immigrants from Taiwan. They were both waishengren of Taiwan; the ancestral homes of his father and mother were in the Hunan and Shandong provinces of mainland China, respectively. Huang was raised in Silver Spring, Maryland, a suburb of Washington, D.C., then moved to Orlando, Florida, where his father owned a successful group of steak and seafood restaurants, including Atlantic Bay Seafood and Grill and Cattleman's Ranch Steakhouse. He appreciated African-American culture, especially hip-hop, at a young age. He also frequently got into fights, getting arrested at least twice on assault charges while growing up.

Huang attended Dr. Phillips High School in Orlando. He also went on to attend the University of Pittsburgh and Rollins College, graduating with a B.A. in English and Film from Rollins in 2004. At Rollins, he also won the Barbara Lawrence Alfond English Award and the Zora Neale Hurston Award, and was Sports and Humor editor for the school paper, The Sandspur. In 2008, Huang earned a J.D. from the Benjamin N. Cardozo School of Law at Yeshiva University. At Cardozo, Huang worked at the Innocence Project, served as President of the Minority Law Students Association and as Vice President of the Asian Pacific American Law Students Association, and also won a New York City Bar Association Minority Fellowship in 2006.

Career 
Huang's first job as an attorney was working in corporate law at the law firm Chadbourne & Parke in New York City. He worked as a summer associate in 2006 and 2007, then was hired as an associate in the firm's corporate department in 2008. Within a year, due to the financial crisis of 2007–08, Huang was laid off, and began working as a stand-up comic and marijuana dealer.

Clothing designer 
From 2006 to 2009, Huang ran a streetwear company called "Hoodman Clothing," initially called "Bergdorf Hoodman." At Hoodman, Huang co-created clothing designs with Art Director Ning Juang, a graphic designer whom he had met in Taiwan.

Chef and restaurateur 
Huang was also interested in food as he had grown up watching his mother cook at home. He also learned cooking techniques from various chefs of different cultural backgrounds and cuisine styles that worked at his father's restaurants. He learned management and how to be a good expeditor: a restaurant employee who manages the communication of information and orders between the back and front of the restaurant, making sure that the food is prepared in the correct order as efficiently and rapidly as possible, and presented to the customer at its peak of quality. Working as an expeditor was a skill he learned from his father. In 2011 Huang was named to the Chow 13, a list of influential people in food presented annually by Chow.com.

Restaurants 

In December 2009, Huang opened BaoHaus, a Taiwanese bun (刈包) shop, in the Lower East Side section of Lower Manhattan. In July 2011, he relocated his first shop to 238 East 14th Street in the East Village with an expanded menu. In October 2020, Huang announced the permanent closure of BaoHaus. Prior to shutting down, the restaurant had been praised by TimeOut for cheap pricing and unique menu items.

Another restaurant, Xiao Ye, was less successful and closed after poor reviews and controversy over its sales of Four Loko.  Sam Sifton, a reviewer for The New York Times, awarded the restaurant zero (out of four) stars, and wrote that "if Mr. Huang spent even a third of the time cooking that he does writing funny blog posts and wry Twitter updates, posting hip-hop videos and responding to Internet friends, rivals, critics and customers, Xiao Ye might be one of the more interesting restaurants to open in New York City in the last few months."

Author 
Huang created the blog called Fresh Off the Boat and later published a memoir with Random House by the same name. Fresh Off the Boat: A Memoir was released in early 2013, receiving favorable reviews from Publishers Weekly and The New York Times.

Double Cup Love: On the Trail of Family, Food, and Broken Hearts in China was published in 2016.

Television 
Huang hosted Cheap Bites on the Cooking Channel at the end of 2011 and also appeared on several episodes of Unique Eats before leaving the Cooking Channel for Viceland, where he hosts a recurring segment, also called Fresh Off the Boat, which was later developed into an hour-long show and renamed Huang's World. In 2014, Huang was the host of Snack Off on MTV. The show featured Huang, mentoring contestants participating in challenges that determine who can whip up the tastiest treats using random ingredients like fish sticks, canned oysters, chocolate and much more.

Fresh Off the Boat 
In 2014, ABC ordered a television series based on his book, also titled Fresh Off the Boat, starring Randall Park and Constance Wu, with Hudson Yang playing Eddie. The show debuted with two preview episodes on February 4, 2015, and premiered in its prime time slot on February 10, 2015.

Huang was outspoken in his criticism of the development process of the show, writing a lengthy essay about his concern that his vision for the show was compromised. Huang has said that he does not watch the show, because he thinks that the storyline after the pilot episode is not what he wrote in his memoir.

Film
In August 2019, it was announced Huang would direct and write Boogie, a coming-of-age movie about a young Chinese-American basketball player's rise to prominence, starring Taylor Takahashi, Pamelyn Chee, Jorge Lendeborg Jr., Mike Moh, Dave East, Pop Smoke, Perry Yung, Alexa Mareka and Taylour Paige, with Focus Features distributing. Huang wrote the screenplay in five days with no plan or outline incorporating the themes that have defined his life such as basketball, feeling adrift in a country where he has always been in a minority, and domestic abuse.

Controversies

Huang drew criticism in May 2015 for comments he made about black women during an interview on Real Time With Bill Maher. He said, "I feel like Asian men have been emasculated so much in America that we're basically treated like black women." Later he engaged in a Twitter exchange on his account @MrEddieHuang with @BlackGirlDanger where he defended his comments, which were called "misogynoir". Huang then tweeted "are we dating cause you wildin. lol" and proceeded to make romantic advancements towards her.

Huang has also drawn criticism for his appropriation of African-American culture.  Huang has stated: "I’ve devoted myself to speaking about people owning their own cultures that they’ve created, that they came over with, and educating people about the foundational values in culture." In The New York Times, Joshua David Stein described Huang as "a walking mixtape of postmodern cultural appropriation." In New Bloom magazine, Brian Hioe wrote that Huang exhibits "misogynistic language and attitudes," non-conventional English speech and dress, and experiences with police that indicate an "adoption of a hip hop influenced persona."

Works and publications 
 Huang, Eddie. Fresh Off the Boat: A Memoir. New York: Spiegel & Grau, 2013; 
Huang, Eddie. Double Cup Love: On the Trail of Family, Food, and Broken Hearts in China. New York : Spiegel & Grau, [2016]
 Huang's World (Viceland) 2016

See also
 Chinese people in New York City
 New Yorkers in journalism
 Taiwanese people in New York City

References

External links
 Fresh Off The Boat (Huang's blog)
 
 

1982 births
American memoirists
American people of Chinese descent
Living people
Rollins College alumni
University of Pittsburgh alumni
People from Silver Spring, Maryland
Writers from Orlando, Florida
Writers from Washington, D.C.
Yeshiva University alumni
American male screenwriters
Film directors from Washington, D.C.
American restaurateurs
Asian American chefs